Konarzyny  (Kashubian Kònôrzënë; formerly , Groß Konarzin, or Groß Konarzyn) is a village in Chojnice County, Pomeranian Voivodeship, in northern Poland. It is the seat of the gmina (administrative district) called Gmina Konarzyny.

For details of the history of the region, see History of Pomerania.

The village has a population of 523.

References

Konarzyny
Pomeranian Voivodeship (1919–1939)